Jnanabharathi is a metro station on the Purple Line of the Namma Metro serving the Bangalore University campus along with Dhanvantri Vana park. This was inaugurated on 29 August 2021 and was commenced to the public on 30 August 2021.

Station layout

Entry/Exits
There are 3 Entry/Exit points – A, B and C. Commuters can use either of the points for their travel.

 Entry/Exit point A: Towards Sri Shwetambhar Terapanth Jain Bhavan side
 Entry/Exit point B: Towards Bangalore University South Gate side
 Entry/Exit point C: Towards Pattanagere side

See also 

 Bangalore
 List of Namma Metro stations
 Transport in Karnataka
 List of metro systems
 List of rapid transit systems in India
 Bangalore portal

References 



Namma Metro stations